The East Baton Rouge Parish School System, also known as East Baton Rouge Schools (EBR Schools) or the East Baton Rouge Parish School Board, is a public school district headquartered in Baton Rouge, Louisiana, United States. The district serves most of East Baton Rouge Parish; it contains 54 elementary schools, 16 middle schools, and 18 high schools.

Students in the three other incorporated cities in the parish are served by separate school systems. Residents in Baker are serviced by the City of Baker School System; Zachary residents attend schools operated by the Zachary Community School Board; while Central residents attend schools in the Central Community School System.

Policies and programs
The district requires all students to wear school uniforms, except those attending Baton Rouge Magnet High School and Liberty Magnet High School.

The district also partners with The Cinderella Project of Baton Rouge, a charity that provides free prom dresses to public high school students who cannot otherwise afford them.

List of schools

Elementary schools
Zoned

 Audubon Elementary School  (Baton Rouge)
 Banks Elementary School  (Baton Rouge) 
 Belfair Elementary School  (Baton Rouge)
 Bernard Terrace Elementary School  (Baton Rouge)
 Broadmoor Elementary School  (Baton Rouge)
 Brookstown Elementary School  (Baton Rouge)
 Brownsfield Elementary School  (Unincorporated area)
 Buchanan Elementary School  (Baton Rouge)
 Capital Elementary School  (Baton Rouge)
 Cedarcrest-Southmoor Elementary School  (Baton Rouge)
 Claiborne Elementary School  (Baton Rouge)
 Crestworth Elementary School  (Baton Rouge)
 Delmont Elementary School (Baton Rouge)
 Dufrocq Elementary School  (Baton Rouge
 Glen Oaks Park Elementary School  (Unincorporated area)
 Greenbrier Elementary School  (Unincorporated area)
 Greenville Elementary School  (Baton Rouge)
 Highland Elementary School  (Baton Rouge)
 Howell Park Elementary School  (Baton Rouge)
 Jefferson Terrace Elementary School  (Unincorporated area)
 La Belle Aire Elementary School  (Baton Rouge)
 Lanier Elementary School  (Unincorporated area)
 LaSalle Elementary School  (Baton Rouge)
 Magnolia Woods Elementary School  (Baton Rouge)
 Melrose Elementary School  (Baton Rouge)
 Merrydale Elementary School  (Unincorporated area)
 North Highlands Elementary School  (Baton Rouge)
 Northeast Elementary School  (PK-6th) (Unincorporated area)
 Park Elementary School  (Baton Rouge)
 Park Forest Elementary School  (Baton Rouge)
 Parkview Elementary School  (Baton Rouge)
 Polk Elementary School  (Baton Rouge)
 Progress Elementary School  (Baton Rouge)
 Riveroaks Elementary School  (Unincorporated area)
 Ryan Elementary School  (Baton Rouge)
 Scotlandville Elementary School  (Baton Rouge) (formally Harding Elementary)
 Sharon Hills Elementary School  (Unincorporated area)
 Shenandoah Elementary School  (Unincorporated area)
 South Boulevard Elementary School  (Baton Rouge)
 Twin Oaks Elementary School  (Baton Rouge)
 University Terrace Elementary School  (Baton Rouge)
 Villa del Rey Elementary School  (Baton Rouge)
 Wedgewood Elementary School  (Baton Rouge)
 Westdale Heights Academic Magnet  (Baton Rouge)
 Westminster Elementary School  (Unincorporated area)
 White Hills Elementary School  (Unincorporated area, near the City of Baker)
 Wildwood Elementary School  (Baton Rouge)
 Winbourne Elementary School  (Baton Rouge)

Alternative
 Baton Rouge Center for Visual and Performing Arts  (BRCVPA) (Baton Rouge)
 Children's Charter School  (Baton Rouge)
 Forest Heights Academy of Excellence

Preschool
 Southdowns Preschool (Baton Rouge)

Middle schools
Zoned

 Broadmoor Magnet Middle School (Baton Rouge)
 Capitol Middle School (Baton Rouge)
 Glasgow Middle School (Baton Rouge)
 Glen Oaks Middle School (Baton Rouge)
 Istrouma Middle Magnet School (Baton Rouge)
 Park Forest Middle School (Baton Rouge)
 Southeast Middle School (Baton Rouge)
 Sherwood Middle Academic Magnet School (Baton Rouge)
 Westdale Middle School (Baton Rouge)
 Woodlawn Middle School (Baton Rouge)

Alternative
 McKinley Middle Academic Magnet School of Visual & Performing Arts] (Baton Rouge)
 Mohican Education Center (Baton Rouge)
 Sherwood Middle Academic Magnet (Baton Rouge)
 Staring Education Center (Baton Rouge)

7-12 schools
 Northeast High School (Unincorporated area)

High schools

Zoned
 Belaire High School (Baton Rouge)
 Broadmoor High School (Baton Rouge)
 Capitol High School (Baton Rouge)
 Glen Oaks High School (Merrydale, Unincorporated area)
 Istrouma High School (Baton Rouge)
 McKinley High School (Baton Rouge)
 Scotlandville Magnet High School (Baton Rouge)
 Tara High School (Baton Rouge)
 Woodlawn High School (Unincorporated)

Magnet

 Baton Rouge Magnet High School (Baton Rouge)
 Liberty Magnet High School (Baton Rouge)

Alternative

Arlington Preparatory Academy (Baton Rouge)
Baton Rouge Readiness Superintendent's Academy (Baton Rouge)
Baton Rouge Preparatory Academy (Baton Rouge)
East Baton Rouge Laboratory Academy (Baton Rouge)
East Baton Rouge Virtual Academy
Northdale Academy (Baton Rouge)

Former schools
 The following, all located in Zachary, left to join Zachary Community School Board in 2002.
 Zachary High School
 Northwestern Middle School
 Copper Mill Elementary School
 Northwestern Elementary School
 Zachary Elementary School
 The following, all located in Central, left to join Central Community School District on July 1, 2007.
 Bellingrath Hills Elementary School
 Tanglewood Elementary School
 Central Middle School
 Central High School

Former school board members
Buckskin Bill Black, for local children's television host; board member from 1994 to 2010
Alfred C. Williams, state representative for East Baton Rouge Parish since 2015; board member from 2003 to 2005

Teachers from the Philippines
Teachers from the Philippines with H-1B visas who were employed at district schools have sued the district and two employment agencies over fees they were charged.

Controversy
In September 2022, East Baton Rouge schools excused 2,100 students from class to attend a field trip billed as a career fair and instead appeared to be a church service. The trip was criticized by parents, teachers, and students for the apparent bait-and-switch, separating the students by gender, and lecturing the female students on topics that included forgiving rapists and encouraging bullying toward transgender students.

References

External links

 East Baton Rouge Parish Public Schools

School districts in Louisiana
Education in East Baton Rouge Parish, Louisiana
Baton Rouge, Louisiana
School districts established in 1880
1880 establishments in Louisiana